Since Kyabram is the first album by singer-songwriter Declan O'Rourke, released in 2004.

Track list
 "No Place To Hide"
 "Birds Of A Feather"
 "Galileo (Someone Like You)"
 "Your World"
 "No Brakes"
 "We Didn't Mean To Go To Sea"
 "1-Way Minds"
 "Love Is The Way"
 "Sarah (Last Night in a Dream)"
 "Everything Is Different"
 "Marrying The Sea"/"Til Death Do Us Part"

References

2004 debut albums
Declan O'Rourke albums